La Marquise is the world's oldest running automobile, as of 2011. It is an 1884 model made by Frenchmen De Dion, Bouton and Trépardoux. The car was a quadricycle prototype named for de Dion's mother.

In 1887, the Count of Dion drove La Marquise in an exhibition that has been called the world's first car race, though no other car showed up. It made the 32-odd-kilometre (20 mile) Paris-to-Versailles round trip at an average speed of 25.5 km/h (almost 16 mph). The following year, he beat Bouton in a three-wheeler with an average speed of 29 km/h (19 mph).

Fueled by coal, wood and bits of paper, the car takes 30–40 minutes to build up enough steam to drive. Top speed is 61 km/h (38 mph).

As the oldest car, it wore the number "0" in the 1996 London to Brighton Veteran Car Run. The vehicle was sold at the 2007 Pebble Beach Concours d'Elegance for $3.52 million. It sold again in 2011 for $4.6 million, a record price for an early automobile.

See also
History of the automobile
De Dion-Bouton
American De Dion (automobile)
Delamare-Deboutteville
List of automobile sales by model
Most expensive cars sold in auction

References

External links
Multimedia:
Video (04:42) - Oldest Running Automobile - "La Marquise" (1884,FR)
-

Vehicles introduced in 1884
Steam cars
Rear-wheel-drive vehicles